Nephopterix melanostyla is a species of snout moth in the genus Nephopterix. It was described by Edward Meyrick in 1879, and is known from Australia (including Parramatta, the type location).

References

Moths described in 1879
Phycitini